Buh Records is a record label from Lima, Peru. It was founded by Luis Alvarado in 2004.

They have released music in genres as diverse as dream pop, post-punk and free improvisation. Mostly of their artists are based in Peru, but have also released music by USA based Amma Ateria and Nava Dunkelman, and a compilation of underground electronic music from Switzerland.

Luis Alvarado has said his aim for Buh Records is to present Peru's past and present to better tell the story of South American sound experimentation and the avant-garde. They have also hosted a Buh Records Festival, featuring audiovisual presentations and a homage to Walter Smetak.

The label has received funding from Peru's ministry of culture, such as for 2021's El fabuloso sonido de Andrés Vargas Pinedo: una colección de música popular amazónica (1966-1974), a compilation featuring the work of flautist Andrés Vargas Pinedo.

Their first releases were distributed on CD-R, but later moved to vinyl, cassette tape, and CD.

The Wire magazine has highlighted their work often, and was featured across four pages in their October 2018 issue.

References

External links 
 Buh Records on Discogs
 Interview with Luis Alvarado (2017)

Peruvian music
Record labels
Record labels established in 2004